The phrase Sun Belt basketball tournament may refer to:

Sun Belt Conference men's basketball tournament
Sun Belt Conference women's basketball tournament